The 2017 Gloucestershire County Council election took place on 4 May 2017 as part of the 2017 local elections in the United Kingdom. All 53 councillors were elected from electoral divisions which returned one county councillor each by first-past-the-post voting for a four-year term of office. Control of the council went from a Conservative Party minority to a majority administration.

All locally registered electors (British, Irish, Commonwealth and European Union citizens) who were aged 18 or over on Thursday 4 May 2017 were entitled to vote in the local elections. Those who were temporarily away from their ordinary address (for example, away working, on holiday, in student accommodation or in hospital) were also entitled to vote in the local elections, although those who had moved abroad and registered as overseas electors cannot vote in the local elections. It is possible to register to vote at more than one address (such as a university student who had a term-time address and lives at home during holidays) at the discretion of the local Electoral Register Office, but it remains an offence to vote more than once in the same local government election.

Summary

The Conservative Party gained nine seats and lost one, leading to a net gain of eight seats. The Liberal Democrats held all their existing seats, remaining the second largest party by total seats and percentage vote, whilst the Labour Party lost four seats. UKIP lost all its seats on the council, whilst the Greens gained a second councillor.

The sole remaining independent lost re-election, although the People Against Bureaucracy Group held on to their seat.

Results

|}

Results by Division

Cheltenham

Cotswold

Forest of Dean 

Alan Preest was elected in 2013 as a UKIP councillor

The seat had previously been gained in a by-election. Changes shown are those from 2013.

Gloucester

Stroud

Tewkesbury

By-elections between 2017 and 2021

Churchdown

A by-election was held on Thursday 3 May 2019 for the Churchdown Division due to the death of County Councillor Jack Williams.

References

2017
2017 English local elections
2010s in Gloucestershire